Juan Carlos Socorro Vera (born 13 May 1972) is a Venezuelan retired footballer who played as a midfielder, currently manager of Spanish club UD San Fernando.

Club career
Save for one season, Caracas-born Socorro spent his entire professional career in Spain, almost always in the Canary Islands. He started in 1991 with UD Las Palmas which would be his main club (ten and a half years), playing one match in the Segunda División in the 1991–92 campaign and suffering relegation.

In the following four seasons, Socorro featured regularly for the team, who achieved promotion from Segunda División B in 1996 after three unsuccessful playoff visits. In 1999–2000 he contributed 17 appearances – only two starts – as they returned to La Liga after an absence of 12 years, spending the following year on loan to another side in the second tier, Elche CF.

Socorro's only season in the top flight was 2001–02, but he appeared in only five league games and was relegated. In January 2003 he moved to lowly Universidad de Las Palmas CF and, subsequently, played one year in his country of birth with Deportivo Italia. After one season with UD Gáldar he retired from football at the age of 34, with 286 competitive appearances for Las Palmas.

International career
Socorro won five caps for Venezuela in one year. He was selected to the squad that appeared in the 1997 Copa América in Bolivia, as the national team finished bottom of their group with three losses and no goals scored.

References

External links

1972 births
Living people
Venezuelan footballers
Footballers from Caracas
Association football midfielders
La Liga players
Segunda División players
Segunda División B players
UD Las Palmas Atlético players
UD Las Palmas players
Elche CF players
Universidad de Las Palmas CF footballers
Deportivo Italia players
Venezuela international footballers
1997 Copa América players
Venezuelan expatriate footballers
Expatriate footballers in Spain
Venezuelan expatriate sportspeople in Spain
Venezuelan football managers
Tercera División managers
Segunda Federación managers
Venezuelan expatriate football managers
Expatriate football managers in Spain